TRUST (Train Running Under System TOPS) is a Network Rail computer system used for monitoring the progress of trains and tracking delays on Great Britain's rail network. It compares actual train movement events with those planned, allowing delays to be recorded with explanations as to the cause allowing the operation of an incentive scheme to reduce delays.

TRUST is used to record when a train passes a measuring point, which can be used to identify delays, and the cause of the delays. It is based on the TOPS mainframe-based computer system. 

TRUST data is part of Network Rail's open data feed and is used by Realtime Trains as a source for train movements and cancellations. A similar computer system is Darwin, from the Rail Delivery Group.

See also
 Signalman (rail)

References

External links
TRUST user guide from 2011 released following a Freedom of Information Request

Railway signalling in the United Kingdom